New Zealand film and television awards have gone by many different names and have been organised by different industry groups. As of 2017, New Zealand has relaunched a standalone New Zealand Television Awards after a five-year hiatus. The film awards continue to be sporadically awarded as the Rialto Channel New Zealand Film Awards (Moas).

History

Early years 

The first New Zealand television awards were the National TV Awards, which ran from 1964–1965, organised by the New Zealand Television Workshop. The trophy was designed by noted sculptor Greer Twiss.

From 1970–1985, the New Zealand Feltex Awards honoured New Zealand television, sponsored by carpet manufacturer Feltex.

GOFTA Awards 

The Feltex Awards were superseded by annual awards organised by the Guild of Film and Television Arts (GOFTA). The awards ran from 1986 to 2003 and were known by a number of different titles, including the GOFTA Awards. The awards were run as joint film and television awards until 2000 when they were split into two separate ceremonies.

The 1987 GOFTA Awards, presented by American TV personality Leeza Gibbons and New Zealand radio host Nic Nolan, is known for its disastrous presentation, including a disruptive audience who heckled guest John Inman, and confusing stage management.

In 1998 the Academy of Film and Television Arts was established by a collection of national guilds including The Techos' Guild, SPADA, WIFT, the Writers Guild and Nga Aho Whakaari. The AFTAs were held in 1999, 2000, 2001 and 2003, sponsored by Nokia.

Qantas Television Awards and New Zealand Screen Awards 

In 2005, the Qantas Television Awards (honouring television and television journalism) and the New Zealand Screen Awards (honouring film and television) were founded as the new award presentations. The Qantas Television Awards were run by the New Zealand Television Broadcasters Council (now known as ThinkTV). These awards celebrated television productions and also incorporated the television media categories that had previously been part of the Qantas Media Awards. The New Zealand Screen Awards were run by the Screen Directors Guild of New Zealand and celebrated both film and television productions, including some overlap with Qantas Television Awards categories.

In 2008 the Qantas Television Awards merged with the New Zealand Screen Awards. From 2008 to 2011, the NZTBC and the SDGNZ jointly ran the Qantas Film and Television Awards. These awards were renamed the Aotearoa Film and Television Awards (abbreviated to AFTA) in 2011.

New Zealand Television Awards and Rialto Channel New Zealand Film Awards 

In 2012 the Screen Directors Guild of New Zealand announced that due to funding and resource restraints it would not be involved with the 2012 AFTAs and would not organise an alternate film industry awards that year.

ThinkTV renamed the new television-focused awards the New Zealand Television Awards for 2012. However, in early 2013, ThinkTV announced that it would no longer hold the New Zealand Television Awards, after partner TVNZ decided not to support the awards. This left New Zealand without an annual television award.

Later in 2012, an alternative film awards presentation was announced, independent of the SDGNZ. The Sorta Unofficial New Zealand Film Awards - also known as the Moas - were organised by film industry figure Ant Timpson and nzherald.co.nz online entertainment editor Hugh Sundae. In 2013 the Moas were renamed the Rialto Channel New Zealand Film Awards. As there were no television awards in 2013, the 2013 Moas had one television award, honouring Best Television Feature or Drama Series.

In addition to sponsoring the Best Score and Best Sound categories at the New Zealand Film Awards since 2013, in 2014 the Australasian Performing Right Association (APRA) introduced two film music awards to its annual Silver Scroll Awards: APRA Best Original Music in a Feature Film Award and APRA Best Original Music in a Series Award.

New Zealand Television Awards and New Zealand Film Awards 
The New Zealand Film Awards were not held in 2015 or 2016, with organisers saying a lack of films released that year made it hard to justify holding the awards. The Moas were held for the fourth time in February 2017, covering the period of October 2014 to November 2016.

The New Zealand Television Awards were revived in 2017 by an independent group of television industry people. As the awards were last held in 2013, the 2017 eligibility period ranged from 1 June 2015 to 30 June 2017. The awards took place on 30 November 2017.  the awards continue to be presented annually.

Awards

See also
 List of television awards

References

External links 
New Zealand Television Awards
Rialto Channel New Zealand Film Awards
The Listener Gofta Awards 1987
Kiwi TV - New Zealand television awards

 New Zealand film and television awards
Awards
 New Zealand film and television awards